Palwasha Hassan (Dari/Pashto: پلوشہ حسن, born 1969) is an Afghan women's rights activist, peace activist and former politician. She was the founder and executive director of the Kabul based non-profit Afghan Women's Educational Center, founded in 1991.

Palwasha Hassan was one of 100 women delegates at the 2003 loya jirga that formed the new constitution. She contributed to the increase of women's reprentation in state affairs in the 2004 constitution, and other articles in it. In January 2010, Palwasha Hassan was picked to be the minister of women's affairs in the Karzai administration.

She holds a master's degree in Post-war Recovery Studies from York University in the UK.

In 2022 Hassan was the US Institute of Peace's Jennings Randolph Afghanistan Fellow. She was employed as their "Director for Rights and Democracy" for her home country of Afghanistan.

Awards

Palwasha Hassan was one of 1,000 women nominees for the 2005 Nobel Peace Prize. She was also one of 11 Afghan women who were jointly finalists in the 2021 Sakharov Prize, the European Parliament's annual human rights prize, losing to the winner Alexei Navalny.

In December 2021 she was awarded the Hillary Rodham Clinton Award for her efforts in promoting women's rights and peace.

References

Living people

1969 births
Afghan women activists
People from Kabul
Afghan refugees